Hep Records is a jazz record company and label founded by Alastair Robertson (born March 3, 1941 in Aberdeen, Scotland) in Edinburgh, Scotland, in 1974.

History 
Hep started as a reissue label for material from radio transcription discs, mainly big band music from the 1940s. Other reissue material includes Fletcher Henderson, Andy Kirk, Jimmie Lunceford, Don Redman and Sam Donahue. When it began to issue new recordings, it added Buddy DeFranco, Don Lanphere, and Eddie Thompson. Other musicians on the catalogue include Slim Gaillard, Boyd Raeburn, Spike Robinson, Slam Stewart, Joe Temperley, and Jessica Williams.

References

External links
Official site

Jazz record labels
Scottish record labels
British jazz record labels
1974 establishments in Europe